Goshen is an unincorporated community within Middle Township, in Cape May County, New Jersey.

Demographics

History
The area was settled by Aaron Leaming, who began raising cattle in 1693. By 1710 there was a settlement. Goshen's first industry was a king crab mill and a canning factory. Shipbuilding and lumbering industries flourished. A post office was established in 1818, with Richard Thompson Jr. as the first postmaster.

The Garrison shipyard on Goshen Creek had stocks for the simultaneous construction of two vessels, which, upon being launched, were slipped into the water sideways. Between 1859 and 1898, twenty-five ships of record were built there, along with many smaller craft. Around 1900, Cape May County's shipbuilding industry was shut down. The last ship launched by the Goshen shipyard was the Diamond in 1898. Due to the lasting effects of the brackish water there, the remains of the docks are still visible at the end of Goshen Landing Road during low tide.

The Tavern House (circa 1725), on the corner of Route 47 and Goshen Landing Road, is one of the oldest homes in Cape May County. At different times it has been a tavern, hotel, dentist office and residence. While significant changes have been made, much of the original workmanship is still evident. Rough-hewn logs still support the house, and wooden pegs hold the rafters in place.

Route 47, also known as Delsea Drive, runs directly through the center of the community.

Education
It is in the Middle Township Public Schools, which operates Middle Township High School.

Countywide schools include Cape May County Technical High School and Cape May County Special Services School District.

Notable people

People who were born in, residents of, or otherwise closely associated with Goshen include:
Andrew J. Tomlin (1845-1906), awarded the Medal of Honor for his actions in the Civil War.

Wineries
 Natali Vineyards

References

Middle Township, New Jersey
Unincorporated communities in Cape May County, New Jersey
Unincorporated communities in New Jersey